Osman Ricardo (25 May 1795 – 2 January 1881) was a British Liberal and Whig politician.

Ricardo was first elected Whig MP for Worcester at the 1847 general election, and, becoming a Liberal in 1859, he held the seat until 1865, when he stood down.

William Cobbett in his 1830 book Rural Rides reports being frightened by a life-sized cross atop the porter's lodge at "Osmond Ricardo's" estate at "Broomsborough" (i.e Bromsberrow), Worcestershire, on Monday 24 September 1826.

References

External links
 

Whig (British political party) MPs for English constituencies
Liberal Party (UK) MPs for English constituencies
Members of the Parliament of the United Kingdom for Worcester
UK MPs 1847–1852
UK MPs 1852–1857
UK MPs 1857–1859
UK MPs 1859–1865
1795 births
1881 deaths